Prometheus is a 1934 gilded, cast bronze sculpture by Paul Manship, located above the lower plaza at Rockefeller Center in Manhattan, New York City.
It depicts the Greek legend of the Titan Prometheus, who was the son of the Titan Iapetus and the Oceanid Clymene, brought fire to mankind by stealing it from the Chariot of the Sun, which resulted in Zeus chaining Prometheus and sending an eagle to prey upon his continually regenerating liver.

Description 

The recumbent figure is in a  fountain basin in front of a gray, rectangular wall in the Lower Plaza, located in the middle of Rockefeller Center. 
The ring – representing the heavens – is inscribed with the signs of the zodiac, which are labeled on the inside of the ring. Through the ring, he falls toward the earth (the mountain) and the sea (the pool).

The inscription – a paraphrase from Aeschylus – on the granite wall behind, reads: "Prometheus, teacher in every art, brought the fire that hath proved to mortals a means to mighty ends."

Prometheus is considered the main artwork of Rockefeller Center, and is one of the complex's more well-known works of art. The seasonal Rockefeller Center Christmas Tree is erected above the statue every winter. During the rest of the year, Prometheus serves as the main aesthetic draw in the lower plaza's outdoor restaurant.

In 2001, Prometheus was regilded by John Canning & Co., an architectural arts restoration company out of Cheshire, Connecticut.

Associated artworks 
The statue was flanked by Manship's Youth and Maiden (the "Mankind Figures"), occupying the granite shelves to the rear. (The shelves are now topped by plants.) 
They were relocated to Palazzo d'Italia from 1939 to 1984, because Manship thought they did not fit visually. Originally gilded, they were given a brown patina when restored. They were moved to the staircase above the skating rink in 2001, as if they are "announcing Prometheus".

Four Prometheus maquettes exist: one at the Smithsonian Institution's Smithsonian American Art Museum, one at the Minnesota Museum of Art, and two in private collections. A full-scale replica existed Grand Indonesia Shopping Town recreated by Legacy Entertainment in Entertainment District's Fountain Atrium located in Jakarta, but it has been removed in late 2019 due to the new LED Screen display.

Models 

The model for Prometheus was Leonardo Nole (–1998), an Italian-American lifeguard from New Rochelle who modeled for college art classes. He spent three months posing for this assignment in the spring of 1933. After World War II, he became a postal worker. 

Manship's assistant Angelo Colombo did most of the detail work when Nole was posing. Henry Kreis, another assistant, sculpted the hair. 

Ray Van Cleef posed for the original small-scale rendering.

Gallery

See also
 1934 in art

References

External links

 

1934 establishments in New York City
1934 sculptures
Art Deco sculptures and memorials
Bronze sculptures in Manhattan
Colossal statues in the United States
Nude sculptures in New York (state)
Outdoor sculptures in Manhattan
Rockefeller Center
Sculptures of classical mythology
Statues in New York City
Works based on Prometheus Bound
Works by Paul Manship